Šoltýs, Šoltys , Šoltis, or Šoltés are Czech and Slovak variants of a surname literally meaning an occupation of šoltys, ultimately derived from German occupation of Schultheiß, head of a municipality or ruler's official. 
Other variants (possibly used by the same person within Austria-Hungary) include Soltis, Soltisz, Soltiš, Szoltisz. Feminine forms are derived by appending the suffix -ová: Šoltésová, etc.

Notable people with the surname include:

Anton Šoltýs, Slovak alpine skier.
Anton Šoltis, Slovak football midfielder and manager
 (1935-1990), Slovak merited pedagogue and physicist
Elena Maróthy-Šoltésová (1855-1939), a Slovak writer, editor, and a leading figure in the women's movement in Slovakia

See also